Paninternational Flight 112 was a BAC One-Eleven operated by German airline Paninternational that crashed in Hamburg on 6 September 1971 while attempting to land on an autobahn following the failure of both engines. The accident killed 22 passengers and crew out of 121 on board.

Aircraft
The aircraft, registered as D-ALAR, had its first flight the year before the accident.

Accident
Paninternational Flight 112 took off from Hamburg Airport in Hamburg, Germany, on a flight to Málaga Airport in Málaga, Spain, with 115 passengers and six crew on board. The captain was Reinhold Hüls, a former military pilot with more than 3,000 hours flying time; co-pilot  was the first woman jet pilot in West Germany, at the time with only 7 hours in the BAC One-Eleven. During the landing, on the south-bound carriageway to avoid heavy traffic out of Hamburg, the aircraft deflected to the left and collided with an overpass and multiple concrete pillars, causing the right wing, cockpit, and T-tail to shear off. The rest of the fuselage broke up and skidded to a halt resting against an oak tree, and subsequently caught fire. The accident killed twenty-one passengers and one crew member.

Cause of the crash
Subsequent investigation showed that the tank for the water-injection engine thrust-augmentation system (used during take-off) had inadvertently been filled with a mix of water and kerosene instead of with demineralised water. Spraying this additional jet fuel into the engines caused them both to overheat and fail shortly after take-off. Two maintenance workers for Paninternational were sentenced to prison terms in 1974.

References

Further information
 

Paninternational accidents and incidents
Aviation accidents and incidents in 1971
Aviation accidents and incidents in Germany
Accidents and incidents involving the BAC One-Eleven
Airliner accidents and incidents caused by engine failure
September 1971 events in Europe
Autobahns in Germany